Hera Pheri is a term meaning wrongdoings or "monkey business"

Hera Pheri may also refer to:

 Hera Pheri (1976 film), a 1976 Hindi movie directed by Prakash Mehra
 Hera Pheri (TV series), a 1999 comedy series starring Shekhar Suman and Rakhi Tandon
 Hera Pheri (film series), a series of Indian comedy films
 Hera Pheri (2000 film), a Hindi comedy directed by Priyadarshan
 Phir Hera Pheri, a 2006 film directed by Neeraj Vora